Spathulina is a genus of tephritid  or fruit flies in the family Tephritidae.

Species
Spathulina abyssinica Bezzi, 1924
Spathulina acroleuca (Schiner, 1868)
Spathulina arcucincta Bezzi, 1924
Spathulina biseuarestina Bezzi, 1924
Spathulina euryomma Bezzi, 1924
Spathulina hessii (Wiedemann, 1818)
Spathulina peringueyi Bezzi, 1924
Spathulina sicula Rondani, 1856

References

Tephritinae
Tephritidae genera
Diptera of Africa
Diptera of Europe
Diptera of Asia